The 2002 season was São Paulo's 73rd season since club's existence. The club became a runners-up of Torneio Rio – São Paulo losing the final to rival Corinthians. Exceptionally this year the main clubs from state like Santos, Corinthians and Palmeiras along São Paulo did not participated of Campeonato Paulista to not overload the number of games in calendar, with two tournaments being disputed at same time, Torneio Rio – São Paulo and Campeonato Paulista, then was created only this year the Supercampeonato paulista played by Corinthians (Torneio Rio-São Paulo winners), São Paulo (Torneio Rio-São Paulo runners-up), Palmeiras (Torneio Rio-São Paulo third place) and Ituano (Campeonato Paulista winners). Tricolor won the title against Ituano, 2-2 (away); 4-1 (home). At Copa do Brasil was defeated again by Corinthians, this time in semifinal. In Copa dos Campeões was eliminated in group stage and quarterfinals in Série A losing to rival Santos.

Squad

Final squad

Statistics

Scorers

Managers performance

Overall

{|class="wikitable"
|-
|Games played || 63 (19 Torneio Rio – São Paulo, 4 Supercampeonato Paulista, 9 Copa do Brasil, 3 Copa dos Campeões, 27 Campeonato Brasileiro, 1 Friendly match)
|-
|Games won || 33 (8 Torneio Rio – São Paulo, 2 Supercampeonato Paulista, 5 Copa do Brasil, 1 Copa dos Campeões, 16 Campeonato Brasileiro, 1 Friendly match)
|-
|Games drawn || 12 (5 Torneio Rio – São Paulo, 2 Supercampeonato Paulista, 0 Copa do Brasil, 1 Copa dos Campeões, 4 Campeonato Brasileiro, 0 Friendly match)
|-
|Games lost || 18 (6 Torneio Rio – São Paulo, 0 Supercampeonato Paulista, 4 Copa do Brasil, 1 Copa dos Campeões, 7 Campeonato Brasileiro, 0 Friendly match)
|-
|Goals scored || 154
|-
|Goals conceded || 97
|-
|Goal difference || +57
|-
|Best result || 7–0 (H) v Bangu - Torneio Rio – São Paulo - 2002.03.17
|-
|Worst result || 0–3 (A) v São Caetano - Campeonato Brasileiro - 2002.09.07
|-
|Top scorer || Reinaldo (31 goals)
|-

Friendlies

Official competitions

Torneio Rio-São Paulo

Record

Copa do Brasil

Record

Supercampeonato Paulista

Record

Copa do Campeões

Record

Campeonato Brasileiro

Record

External links
official website 

Brazilian football clubs 2002 season
2002